Manaus Futebol Clube, commonly referred to as Manaus, is a Brazilian professional club based in Manaus, Amazonas founded on 5 May 2013. It competes in the Campeonato Brasileiro Série C, the third tier of Brazilian football, as well as in the Campeonato Amazonense, the top flight of the Amazonas state football league.

History

The club emerged as a project of the city councilman of Manaus, Luís Mitoso, after he left the board of Nacional for private matters. Mitoso retired from Nacional in March 2013, when he was vice president of the club, after four years leading the club as president, in the company of Giovane Alves.

Manaus was officially founded on May 5, 2013. In the same year, it won the second division of Campeonato Amazonense. After being usually 5th or 6th in 2014 to 2016, in 2017, the club won the title of the main division of the Campeonato Amazonense after defeating Nacional in the final.

In 2018, Manaus once again won the main division of the Campeonato Amazonense by defeating Fast Clube in the final. They also played Série D later that year. They were knocked out in the quarter-finals by Imperatriz-MA on penalties, denying them a spot in Série C for 2019.

In 2019, Manaus won for the third time straight the Campeonato Amazonense, against Fast again. In Série D, Manaus easily qualified to the knockout phase as the best team in overall standings. They gained promotion to 2020's Série C after defeating Caxias 3–0 on the second leg of the quarter-finals after losing 1-0 in Caxias' home.

Players

First-team squad

Out on loan

Stadium
Manaus play their home games at Estádio da Colina. The stadium has a maximum capacity of 10,400 people. They also tend to play in Arena da Amazônia on big games.

Honours
 Campeonato Amazonense
 Winners (5): 2017, 2018, 2019, 2021, 2022

 Campeonato Amazonense Second Division
 Winners (1): 2013

References

External links
 Official Site
 Manaus on Globo Esporte

Manaus Futebol Clube
Football clubs in Amazonas (Brazilian state)
Association football clubs established in 2013
Football clubs in Brazil
Manaus
2013 establishments in Brazil